The Alz is a river in Bavaria, southern Germany, the only discharge of the Chiemsee. Its origin is on the northern shore near Seebruck. It is a right tributary of the Inn, into which it flows in Marktl. Other towns on the Alz are Altenmarkt an der Alz, Trostberg, Garching an der Alz and Burgkirchen an der Alz.

The Traun, a  river flowing past the regional administrative center of Traunstein, is a tributary of the Alz.

Etymology
From pre-indoeuropean *alz "swamp, alder".

References

External links
 Wasserwirtschaftsamt Traunstein, Die Alz 

 
Rivers of Bavaria
Altötting (district)
Traunstein (district)
Rivers of Germany